Fernanda Porto Venturini  (born October 24, 1970 in Ribeirão Preto)  is a former volleyball player from Brazil. She represented her native country at the 1996 Summer Olympics in Atlanta, Georgia.She won the bronze medal with the Women's National Team.

Clubs
  Recra/Ribeirão Preto (1984–1985)
  São Caetano (1986–1987)
  Sadia Esporte Clube (1987–1991)
  Minas Tênis Clube (1991–1992)
  Recra/Ribeirão Preto (1992–1994)
  Soracaba Esporte Clube (1994–1997)
  Paraná (1997–2000)
  Vasco da Gama (2000–2001)
  Osasco (2002–2004)
  Rio de Janeiro (2004–2006)
  CAV Murcia 2005 (2007–2008)
  Rio de Janeiro (2011–2012)

Awards

Individuals
 1989 FIVB U20 World Championship – "Best Setter"
 1991 FIVB Club World Championship – "Best Setter"
 1991 FIVB Volleyball Women's World Cup "Best Setter"
 1993 FIVB World Grand Prix – "Best Setter"
 1993 FIVB World Grand Prix – "1993 Dream Team Setter"
 1994 FIVB World Grand Prix – "Most Valuable Player"
 1994 FIVB World Grand Prix – "1994 Dream Team Setter"
 1994 FIVB World Grand Prix – "Best Setter"
 1994 FIVB Club World Championship – "Best Setter"
 1995 FIVB World Grand Prix – "Best Setter"
 1995 FIVB Volleyball Women's World Cup "Best Setter"
 1996 Summer Olympics – "Best Setter"
 1996 FIVB World Grand Prix – "Best Setter"
 1996 FIVB World Grand Prix – "1996 Dream Team Setter"
 1996 Montreux Volley Masters – "Best Setter"
 1996 Montreux Volley Masters – "Best Server"
 1997 World Grand Champions Cup – "Best Setter"
 1998 FIVB Club World Championship – "Best Setter"
 2003 FIVB World Grand Prix – "Best Setter"
 2003 FIVB World Grand Prix – "2003 Dream team Setter"
 2003 FIVB World Cup "Best Setter"
 2004 FIVB World Grand Prix – "Best Setter"
 2004 FIVB World Grand Prix – "2004 Dream Team Setter"

References

1970 births
Living people
People from Ribeirão Preto
Brazilian women's volleyball players
Olympic volleyball players of Brazil
Volleyball players at the 1988 Summer Olympics
Volleyball players at the 1992 Summer Olympics
Volleyball players at the 1996 Summer Olympics
Volleyball players at the 2004 Summer Olympics
Olympic bronze medalists for Brazil
Olympic medalists in volleyball
Medalists at the 1996 Summer Olympics
Brazilian expatriate sportspeople in Spain
Setters (volleyball)
Pan American Games medalists in volleyball
Pan American Games silver medalists for Brazil
Volleyball players at the 1991 Pan American Games
Medalists at the 1991 Pan American Games
Sportspeople from São Paulo (state)